Kenny Stafford (born April 20, 1990) is a gridiron football wide receiver who is currently a free agent. He was most recently a member of the Ottawa Redblacks of the Canadian Football League (CFL). In the United States, he has been a member of the Atlanta Falcons (NFL), Pittsburgh Power (AFL) and Miami Dolphins (NFL). In the CFL, Stafford has been a member of the Calgary Stampeders, Montreal Alouettes, Winnipeg Blue Bombers, Edmonton Eskimos, and Saskatchewan Roughriders. He is the nephew of former American football wide receiver and 2013 Pro Football Hall of Fame inductee Cris Carter.

College career

Stafford played collegiately for the University of Toledo.

Professional career

Atlanta Falcons
Stafford was signed as an undrafted free agent with the Atlanta Falcons.

Pittsburgh Power
Stafford signed with the Arena Football League's Pittsburgh Power for the 2013 season. Stafford played in one game with the Power, recording 6 receptions for 109 yards and two touchdowns.

Montreal Alouettes
Stafford was placed on the other league exempt list by the Pittsburgh Power when he signed with the Canadian Football League's Montreal Alouettes. However, he did not make an appearance with the Al's at this time.

Miami Dolphins
Stafford was signed by the Miami Dolphins on July 19, 2013. On August 23, 2013, he was waived by the Dolphins.

Calgary Stampeders
Stafford signed with the Calgary Stampeders on August 28, 2013. Stafford caught 6 passes for 37 yards in 3 games for the Stamps during the 2013 CFL season. He was released by the Stampeders on November 18, 2013.

Montreal Alouettes (II)
Stafford played for the Montreal Alouettes during the 2014 season. During said season he caught 20 passes for 230 receiving yards and 1 touchdown.

Edmonton Eskimos
In the CFL off-season Stafford was traded to the Edmonton Eskimos in exchange for Fred Stamps on January 16, 2015. He had a breakout season with the Eskimos playing in all 18 regular season games and all 3 playoffs games including the 103rd Grey Cup game. During the season Stafford caught 47 passes for 732 yards and 9 touchdowns (all career highs).

Montreal Alouettes (III)
Upon entering free agency on February 9, 2016, Stafford signed a one-year deal with the Montreal Alouettes On September 13, 2016 Kenny Stafford and fellow wide receiver Duron Carter, Stafford's cousin, got into a heated exchange at practice with newly promoted quarterback Rakeem Cato. On October 17, 2016 Stafford was released by the Al's alongside Duron Carter. Stafford played in 9 games during the 2016 season, catching 16 passes for 215 yards with 2 touchdowns.

Winnipeg Blue Bombers 
On January 17, 2017, Stafford signed as a free agent with the Winnipeg Blue Bombers of the Canadian Football League. Stafford was cut by the Bombers on June 17, 2017; the league's final roster cut-down day.

Edmonton Eskimos (II) 
Later that same day Stafford signed a practice roster deal with the Edmonton Eskimos. Stafford played a season and a half with the Eskimos, catching a career high 55 receptions for 781 yards during the 2018 season. In seven games with Edmonton the following season he caught 30 passes for 366 yards with 2 touchdowns.

Saskatchewan Roughriders 
On August 5, 2019, Stafford was traded to the Saskatchewan Roughriders in exchange for kick returner Christion Jones. He did not play in a game for the Roughriders and was released on January 20, 2021.

Edmonton Elks 
Stafford signed with the Edmonton Elks on June 23, 2021. He was released on July 21, 2021.

Ottawa Redblacks 
On September 13, 2021, it was announced that Stafford had signed with the Ottawa Redblacks. He played in eight games for the Redblacks during the 2021 season, catching 17 passes for 242 yards with three touchdowns. Stafford was released by the Redblacks on January 13, 2022.

Career statistics

References

External links
Ottawa Redblacks bio
Edmonton Eskimos bio
Montreal Alouettes bio
Toledo Profile

1990 births
Living people
American football wide receivers
Canadian football wide receivers
African-American players of American football
African-American players of Canadian football
Players of Canadian football from Columbus, Ohio
Players of American football from Columbus, Ohio
Pittsburgh Power players
Calgary Stampeders players
Montreal Alouettes players
Edmonton Elks players
Toledo Rockets football players
Saskatchewan Roughriders players
Ottawa Redblacks players
21st-century African-American sportspeople